Superserien is the highest level of American football in Sweden, founded 1985 and became official in 1991. The number of teams in the top league has varied through the years, ranging from 4 to 10.

Superserien teams (2022)

Superserien seasons

External links
 Official website

References

American football leagues in Europe
American football in Sweden
Sports leagues in Sweden
Sports leagues established in 1991
1991 establishments in Sweden
Professional sports leagues in Sweden